SN 1994D was a Type Ia supernova event in the outskirts of galaxy NGC 4526. It was caused by the explosion of a white dwarf star composed of carbon and oxygen. This event was discovered on March 7, 1994 by R. R. Treffers and associates using the automated 30-inch telescope at Leuschner Observatory. It reached peak visual brightness two weeks later on March 22. Modelling of the light curve indicates the explosion would have been visible around March 3-4. A possible detection of helium in the spectrum was made by W. P. S. Meikle and associates in 1996.

See also
History of supernova observation

References

Further reading

External links
 Light curves and spectra  on the Open Supernova Catalog

Supernovae
19940307
Virgo (constellation)